Marcus Olofsson (born August 4, 1982) is a Swedish footballer currently playing for IFK Lidingö FK.

References

1982 births
Living people
Swedish footballers
Association football midfielders
Veikkausliiga players
GIF Sundsvall players
Friska Viljor FC players
Sandvikens IF players
IFK Mariehamn players
Valbo FF players
Swedish expatriate footballers
Expatriate footballers in Finland
Swedish expatriate sportspeople in Finland